Weetaliba is a village in the Warrumbungle Shire of New South Wales, Australia. At the 2016 census, Weetaliba had a population of 50.

References

Towns in New South Wales
Warrumbungle Shire